The Valley of Ghosts may refer to:
 Valley of Ghosts (Crimea), a valley with unusual rock formations
 The Valley of Ghosts (novel), a 1922 novel by Edgar Wallace
 The Valley of Ghosts (film), a 1928 film directed by G.B. Samuelson